Qinghai, a province of the People's Republic of China, is made up of the following administrative divisions.

Administrative divisions
All of these administrative divisions are explained in greater detail at Administrative divisions of the People's Republic of China. This chart lists all prefecture-level and county-level divisions of Qinghai.

Administrative divisions history

Recent changes in administrative divisions

Population composition

Prefectures

Counties

Drafted and proposed cities
Qinghai is planning to re-organise the following administrative divisions:

County-level cities
Gonghe ← Gonghe County
Guide ← Guide County
Haiyan ← Haiyan County
Qaidam ← Da Qaidam and Delingha
Maqin ← Maqin County

See also 

 List of township-level divisions of Qinghai, for towns and townships

References

Qinghai